Tadhg Buidhe mac Tadhg Riabhach Ó Dubhda (died ) Chief of the Name and Lord of Tireragh.

Almost the only document dealing with the succession as the Ó Dubhda chief of the name is Araile do fhlathaibh Ua nDubhda, which presents many chronological difficulties. Even when dates and/or lengths of reigns are given, they can only be appromiximated as some chiefs may have ruled in opposition to each other. 

Araile gives Tadhg Buidhe "3 years."

References

 Araile do fhlathaibh Ua nDubhda/Some of the princes of Ui Dhubhda, pp.676-681, Leabhar na nGenealach:The Great Book of Irish Genealogies, Dubhaltach Mac Fhirbhisigh (died 1671), eag. Nollaig Ó Muraíle, 2004-05, De Burca, Dublin.

External links
 http://www.ucc.ie/celt/published/T100005C/index.html

Medieval Gaels from Ireland
People from County Mayo
People from County Sligo
15th-century Irish people
Irish lords